Edward Butler (born October 11, 1949) is an American politician who was a Democratic member of the New Hampshire House of Representatives, representing the Carroll 7th District (Albany, Bartlett, Chatham, Conway, Eaton, Freedom, Hale's Location, Hart's Location, Jackson, Madison, and Tamworth) from 2006 to 2020.

Butler is openly gay. A resident of Hart's Location, Butler and his husband own and operate the town's Notchland Inn.

References

External links
New Hampshire House of Representatives - Edward Butler official NH House website
Project Vote Smart - Representative Edward Butler (NH) profile
Follow the Money - Edward Butler
2006 campaign contributions

1949 births
Living people
21st-century American politicians
Democratic Party members of the New Hampshire House of Representatives
Gay politicians
LGBT state legislators in New Hampshire
People from Carroll County, New Hampshire
People from Little Falls, New York